The 1931 Brooklyn Robins finished in 4th place, after which longtime manager Wilbert Robinson announced his retirement with 1,399 career victories.

Offseason 
 October 14, 1930: Clise Dudley, Jumbo Elliott, Hal Lee and cash were traded by the Robins to the Philadelphia Phillies for Lefty O'Doul and Fresco Thompson.

Regular season 
Jack Quinn became the oldest person in baseball history to pitch on Opening Day. He was 47 when he started for Brooklyn on Opening Day in 1931. It would be Quinn's only start of the season, as he pitched the rest of the year in relief.

Season standings

Record vs. opponents

Notable transactions 
 May 7, 1931: Harvey Hendrick was traded by the Robins to the Cincinnati Reds for Mickey Heath.
 May 23, 1931: Ray Moss was purchased from the Robins by the Boston Braves.

Roster

Player stats

Batting

Starters by position 
Note: Pos = Position; G = Games played; AB = At bats; R = Runs; H = Hits; Avg. = Batting average; HR = Home runs; RBI = Runs batted in; SB = Stolen bases

Other batters 
Note: G = Games played; AB = At bats; R = Runs; H = Hits; Avg. = Batting average; HR = Home runs; RBI = Runs batted in; SB = Stolen bases

Pitching

Starting pitchers 
Note: G = Games pitched; GS = Games started; CG = Complete games; IP = Innings pitched; W = Wins; L = Losses; ERA = Earned run average; BB = Bases on balls; SO = Strikeouts

Other pitchers 
Note: G = Games pitched; GS = Games started; CG = Complete games; IP = Innings pitched; W = Wins; L = Losses; ERA = Earned run average; BB = Bases on balls; SO = Strikeouts

Relief pitchers 
Note: G = Games pitched; IP = Innings pitched; W = Wins; L = Losses; SV = Saves; ERA = Earned run average; BB = Bases on balls; SO = Strikeouts

Awards and honors

League top five finishers 
Babe Herman
 #2 in NL in stolen bases (17)

Dazzy Vance
 #3 in NL in strikeouts (150)

Notes

References 
Baseball-Reference season page
Baseball Almanac season page

External links 
1931 Brooklyn Robins uniform
Brooklyn Dodgers reference site
Acme Dodgers page 
Retrosheet

Los Angeles Dodgers seasons
Brooklyn Robins season
Brooklyn
1930s in Brooklyn
Flatbush, Brooklyn